Loßburg is a municipality in the district of Freudenstadt in Baden-Württemberg in southern Germany.

Geography

Kinzig 
The source of the Kinzig is located on the Gemarkung of Loßburg.

Municipal Structure 
The town of Loßburg consists of the eight districts Loßburg, Betzweiler, Lombach, Schömberg, Sterneck, Wälde, Wittendorf and 24-Höfe a district consisting of several hamlets and homesteads.

Politics

Municipal council 
The municipal council consists of the elected council members and the mayor as chair of the committee.

Result of the last election on 26 May 2019.

Mayor 
Christoph Enderle was elected 2013 as mayor of Loßburg. His predecessor was Thilo Schreiber.

Crest 
Blazon: "On blue background a green hill and a silver tower. Above the tower is the  white letter L."

Town twinning 
Loßburg is twinned with Anse (France), Harta (Hungary), and Hammerbrücke (Saxony).

References

Freudenstadt (district)
Württemberg